Libor Ustrnul (born February 20, 1982) is a Czech former professional ice hockey player.

Ustrnul was drafted 42nd overall by the Atlanta Thrashers in the 2000 NHL Entry Draft.  He spent three seasons in the organization and played for their American Hockey League affiliate the Chicago Wolves as well as a spell in the ECHL for the Gwinnett Gladiators but never played in the NHL.  He then spent three seasons in the Czech Extraliga for HC Karlovy Vary which followed with a brief spell with HIFK in the SM-liiga in Finland.  He played one more season in the Central Hockey League for the Rapid City Rush before retiring.

Career statistics

Regular season and playoffs

International

References 

his daughter

External links 
 

1982 births
Atlanta Thrashers draft picks
Chicago Wolves players
Czech ice hockey defencemen
Gwinnett Gladiators players
HC Karlovy Vary players
HIFK (ice hockey) players
Living people
People from Šternberk
Plymouth Whalers players
Rapid City Rush players
Thunder Bay Flyers players
Sportspeople from the Olomouc Region
Czech expatriate ice hockey players in Canada
Czech expatriate ice hockey players in Finland
Czech expatriate ice hockey players in the United States